Alexis Malkolm Ahlgren (14 July 1887 – 14 March 1969) was a Swedish long-distance runner who on 31 May 1913 set a world best of 2:36:06 at the Polytechnic Marathon. He competed in the men's marathon at the 1912 Summer Olympics but did not finish. He was born in Trollhättan.

References

1887 births
1969 deaths
People from Trollhättan Municipality
Swedish male long-distance runners
Swedish male marathon runners
World record setters in athletics (track and field)
Athletes (track and field) at the 1912 Summer Olympics
Olympic athletes of Sweden
Sportspeople from Västra Götaland County